Daniel Alexander Cameron (December 10, 1870 – September 4, 1937) was a Canadian politician from the province of Nova Scotia. He was one of the first Nova Scotian legislators of the 20th century to die while in office.

Early life and career 
Born in Sydney River, Nova Scotia, the son of John and Isabella (Macdonald) Cameron, Cameron was educated at Sydney Academy and Dalhousie University where he received a Bachelor of Laws degree. He was admitted to the bar in October 1893. In 1894, he started practicing law in Sydney. He was a member of the County Council from 1900 to 1911. He was the stipendiary magistrate for Sydney from 1905 to 1911. In 1911, he was appointed treasurer and
solicitor for the Municipality of Cape Breton.

Political career 
In 1916, he was elected to the Nova Scotia House of Assembly for the electoral district of Cape Breton. A Nova Scotia Liberal, he was defeated in 1920. From 1921 to 1923, he was a Member of the Legislative Council of Nova Scotia and was a Minister Without Portfolio in the cabinet of George Henry Murray. He resigned from the Legislative Council in 1923 and was elected to the House of Assembly for Victoria County. From 1923 to 1925, he was the Provincial Secretary in the cabinet of Ernest Howard Armstrong. He resigned in 1930 and was defeated in the 1930 federal election when he ran as the Liberal candidate for the electoral district of Cape Breton South. He was elected in the 1935 election for the electoral district of Cape Breton North and Victoria. He served for a little less than two years before he died in office in 1937.

References
 
 

1870 births
1937 deaths
Canadian Presbyterians
Dalhousie University alumni
Liberal Party of Canada MPs
Members of the House of Commons of Canada from Nova Scotia
Members of the Legislative Council of Nova Scotia
Nova Scotia Liberal Party MLAs